Divignano is a comune (municipality) in the Province of Novara in the Italian region Piedmont, located about  northeast of Turin and about  north of Novara.

Divignano borders the following municipalities: Agrate Conturbia, Borgo Ticino, Marano Ticino, Mezzomerico, Pombia, and Varallo Pombia.

References

Cities and towns in Piedmont